Hubert Hosack Jack (February 23, 1904 – March 15, 1981) was an American football and wrestling coach. He was the head wrestling coach at Lock Haven University of Pennsylvania from 1943 to 1962 and football coach from 1946 to 1968. He led the wrestling team to a 153–39–5 record and the football team to a 102–91–7 record. He retired from coaching in January 1969. 

Jack was graduate of Grove City High School in Grove City, Pennsylvania, Slippery Rock State Teachers College—now known as Slippery Rock University—in Slippery Rock, Pennsylvania, and the University of Pittsburgh.

Death and honors
Jack died on March 15, 1981, while attending the NCAA Division I Wrestling Championships in Princeton, New Jersey.

Jack was inducted into the Helms Hall Amateur Wrestling Hall of Fame in 1963 and the Lock Haven Hall of Fame in 2015. Hubert Jack Stadium, Lock Haven's home football venue, is named in his honor.

Head coaching record

College football

References

1904 births
1981 deaths
American wrestling coaches
Lock Haven Bald Eagles football coaches
College wrestling coaches in the United States
High school football coaches in Pennsylvania
High school track and field coaches in the United States
High school wrestling coaches in the United States
Slippery Rock University of Pennsylvania alumni
University of Pittsburgh alumni
People from Grove City, Pennsylvania
Coaches of American football from Pennsylvania